SadarJi Bhatyoon (Sindhi: صدر جی بہتیون, Urdu: صدر جی بہتیون‬) is a village in Sindh province of Pakistan.

Geography 
It is located approximately 25 kilometers from the city of Khairpur District, and approximately 10 kilometers from the ancient Pir Jo Goth fort.

History 
SadarJi Bhatyoon is a monument to a Sindh to sell turbines for 8 years. There was a certain Abdul wind, whose name was Bhatti, due to which his name was people who were Abdul, then when the government of Talpur So, the population here would be more than the current growth rate slowly there were problems, then a person here slowly commenced that which came to him before he could go back to Sheikh again and then again, Abbasi again forgot to tell him something good. Marani Bhanger, here.

There were also many other polling stations between the PTI, PMLF, PPP and other independent constituencies. Meanwhile, SHO Abdul Satar Kalhoro, due to the charming attack on SadarJi Bhatyoon, polling station, died in the passing of a polling agent of the PTI agent, Hidayatullah Suprio in the polling station.

Education 
Government Primary Boys School SadarJi Bhatyon was established in 1990 AD. Government High School Sadarji Bhatyon 1988 AD.[5] Government Girls Primary School, Sadarji Bhatyon Private sector, Shakeel Model Public School, Angles Public School Sadar Ji Bhatyoon, Nova Public School, Sindh education foundation Sadar Ji Bhatyoon.

See also 
 Khairpur (princely state)

References

External links 
On Wikimapia

Populated places in Khairpur District
Populated places in Sindh
Khairpur District